Andrew John Watson (born 16 July 1961) is the Bishop of Guildford in the Church of England. He previously served as Bishop of Aston, the suffragan bishop of the Diocese of Birmingham, from 2008 until 2014.

Early life and education
Watson was born, the son of Angus and Alison Watson, in Bicester, Oxfordshire, and was educated at Winchester College. A keen musician, he played the bassoon in the National Youth Orchestra Of Great Britain from 1974-6. He went on to study Law at Corpus Christi College, Cambridge, where he also held a music exhibition and sang in the chapel choir. He received his Bachelor of Arts (BA) degree in 1982, which was later promoted to a Master of Arts (MA Cantab) degree. Following two years working as a caretaker and youth worker at St Mary’s Islington he returned to Cambridge in 1984, where he completed a second degree (in Theology) whilst training for the ministry at Ridley Hall, Cambridge.

Ordained ministry
Leaving Ridley in 1987, he was ordained deacon that Michaelmas (27 September) at St Stephen's, Redditch, and priest the following Petertide (3 July 1988) at Worcester Cathedral, on both occasions by Philip Goodrich, Bishop of Worcester. His first positions were curacies at St Peter's Ipsley in the Diocese of Worcester (1987–1991) and at St John's & St Peter's, Notting Hill in the Diocese of London (1991–1996). During his time in Notting Hill, he oversaw the restoration of St. Peter’s, a Grade 2* listed building, as well as developing a community cafe on Portobello Road and a Prison Fellowship team at Wormwood Scrubs. Watson then moved to be Vicar of St Stephen's, East Twickenham (1996–2008), overseeing the building of the CrossWay Hall, and sending out three church grafting teams to All Souls St Margarets, St. Saviours Sunbury and the Ivybridge estate. Whilst at Twickenham, he was also Area Dean of Hampton from 2003 onwards.

Episcopal ministry
In 2008, he was appointed as Bishop of Aston in Birmingham Diocese and was consecrated a bishop on 28 October 2008. There he designed the Diocesan mission strategy ‘Transforming Church’, as well as developing the diocese’s historic links with the church in Malawi. He also engaged in interfaith work, especially in response to the death of three young Muslim men in the summer riots of 2011

On 26 September 2014 it was announced that he would be translated to Bishop of Guildford. The confirmation of his election to the See of Guildford occurred on 24 November 2014,  and his ministry was inaugurated at Guildford Cathedral on 28 February 2015.

Watson was introduced into the House of Lords as one of the Lords Spiritual on 9 February 2022.

Views
In 2023, following the news that the House of Bishop's of the Church of England was to introduce proposals for blessing same-sex relationships, he signed an open letter which stated:

Family and interests
Watson married in 1986, and his wife Beverly was ordained a deacon in 2008 and a priest the following year. They have four children. He is the author of The Fourfold Leadership of Jesus, Confidence in the Living God (2009), The Way of the Desert (2011)  and The Great Vocations Conversation (with Magdalen Smith, 2018). He has variously chaired the CPAS Trustees, the Panel for World Mission & the Anglican Communion, and the Ordained Vocations Working Group, which oversaw a considerable rise in the number of ordained vocations over the years 2015 to 2020.

The grandson of CMS missionaries in China, Watson has a strong commitment to the global church, especially in those parts of the world where Christians face discrimination and persecution. As a young adult he met with Christians behind the Iron Curtain, and has since travelled to China, India, Pakistan and parts of Africa where religious extremism is on the rise. He preached at the 70th anniversary of the Church of South India in Chennai in 2017 and at the Sialkot Convention in Pakistan in 2019. On November 10th 2018 he and his wife took a walk on Longsands Beach in Tynemouth exactly a hundred years after his grandfather received his call to missionary service there. Watson is also a regular contributor to renewal conferences in Sweden. 

Watson wrote a setting of George Herbert’s Love bade me Welcome, which was sung at his consecration, and a choral Mass for the 60th anniversary of the consecration of Guildford Cathedral, which was first sung at the feast of Christ the King in 2021. Three instrumental settings of children’s worship songs appear on the albums God’s Wonderful World and Thankyou God for Snails.

In February 2015, his handling of the controversy over anti-semitic material that was shared online by Stephen Sizer was praised by the Jewish community. 

In February 2017, he said that as a young man he was beaten by John Smyth.

Styles
The Reverend Andrew Watson (1988–2008)
The Right Reverend Andrew Watson (2008–present)

References

1961 births
People educated at Winchester College
Alumni of Corpus Christi College, Cambridge
21st-century Church of England bishops
Living people
Bishops of Aston
Bishops of Guildford
Evangelical Anglican bishops
Lords Spiritual